Kirsten J. Childs is an  American playwright, librettist, and former actress.

Early life and performing career
Childs was born in Los Angeles, California. Her parents were schoolteachers. Her younger brother is the jazz musician Billy Childs. She began her theatrical career in the late 1970s as a Broadway performer. In 1977 Bob Fosse cast her in the lead role of Velma Kelly in the first national tour of Chicago.  She went on to appear in productions of Dancin', Jerry's Girls, and Sweet Charity in the 1980s. Primarily a stage actress, her one major film role was the 1989 comedy  See No Evil, Hear No Evil, in which she played the long-suffering sister of Richard Pryor's character.

Later writing career
Childs subsequently turned to writing her own theatrical productions, beginning with the semi-autobiographical  work The Bubbly Black Girl Sheds Her Chameleon Skin (2000), an off-Broadway musical which received an Obie Award. Her other musicals include Miracle Brothers (2005), 
Funked Up Fairy Tales (2007),
and Bella: An American Tall Tale (2016), a winner of the Weston Playhouse New Musical Award.

Childs has also served as an  assistant professor in New York University Tisch School of the Arts' Graduate Musical Theatre Writing program.

References

External links 
New York University Tisch School of the Arts – Profile
Broadway World – Profile

Living people
American women dramatists and playwrights
21st-century American dramatists and playwrights
20th-century American actresses
African-American dramatists and playwrights
African-American actresses
Actresses from Los Angeles
Writers from Los Angeles
American stage actresses
American film actresses
Tisch School of the Arts faculty
Year of birth missing (living people)
21st-century American actresses